The Richmond, Petersham and Ham Open Spaces Act 1902 was enacted to protect the view from Richmond Hill, London.

Ham and Petersham Commons and certain meadows and manorial rights in the same were vested in the Richmond Corporation for purposes of public enjoyment. The lammas rights on part of the manor were also, by the same Act, taken from the commoners who had enjoyed rights of pasture. The river-side, from Petersham to Kingston, was put under the Richmond Corporation and the Surrey County Council, in two sections, for enjoyment by the public for ever.

An initial bill, The Petersham and Ham Lands Footpaths Bill presented by Lord Dysart in 1896 seeking to enclose  of lammas lands was defeated by 262 votes to 118 as it was deemed to contravene the Metropolitan Commons Acts 1866 to 1878.

The act itself details that in December 1896, a local enquiry was established with the Board of Agriculture to consider a scheme for the lammas lands under the Metropolitan Commons Acts. The Board determined that the provisions of the acts did not apply in this case.

A few years later, the Private Bill, the Richmond Hill (Preservation of View) Bill, passed through the committee stage. The latter bill contained the same proposals but more concessions than its predecessor and focused more on the preservation of the view from Richmond Hill. It was challenged, unsuccessfully, in the House of Commons with votes divided 179 in favour of the bill to 79 against. Despite the earlier ruling by the Board of Agriculture, the Attorney-General Sir Robert Finlay definitively advised the House of Lords that the Metropolitan Commons Acts did apply to the lammas lands and thus those laws would need to be overlooked for the Bill to pass.

The Richmond, Petersham and Ham Open Spaces Act gained Royal Assent on the 18 November 1902.

The Act was proposed to be amended by clause 20 of the bill leading to the Greater London Council (General Powers) Act 1982.

References

External links
 

 

1900s in London
Acts of the Parliament of the United Kingdom concerning London
Ham, London
History of the London Borough of Richmond upon Thames
Petersham, London
Richmond, London
United Kingdom Acts of Parliament 1902